Mala Aai Vhhaychy! is a 2011 Indian Marathi-language film produced and directed by Samruoddhi Porey. The story deals with growing surrogacy practices in India where women are used as surrogates by foreigners. The film is an emotional drama telling the story of one such surrogate mother who bears a foreigner's child. 

The film is critically acclaimed and won National Film Award for Best Feature Film in Marathi in 2011. It was remade in Telugu as Welcome Obama  in 2013, and in Hindi as Mimi in 2021.

Plot
Mary comes looking to India for a surrogate mother to bear a child. She finds a poor woman Yashoda who accepts the offer. Yashoda gets pregnant successfully. But during her pregnancy, doctors inform Mary & Yashoda that due to some complications the child would probably be born with disabilities. Mary decides to quit through this and leaves India. Yashoda begs her to not leave. But she is then left alone with a child in her womb. Few years later Mary loses her patience and decided to come back and look for her child.

The film shows the story in legal and emotional perspective of who should the child be with; his surrogate mother who raised him or his mother who has the blood relation with him.

Cast
Urmila Kanetkar as Yashoda
Stacy Bee as Mary 
Samruoddhi Porey as Nanda
Aiden Barkely as Madhav
Vivek Raut as Ganpath
Sulbha Deshpande as Sindhu tai
Askhay Deshpande
Shreya Porey
Suchitra Bandekar
Matt Ridde
Rupali Modak|Rupali Modak
Atul Bhardwaj
Sandip Rajput
Ronit Malode
Srushti Porey
Shubhankar Raut
Nakshatra Rajgire
Sumit Ghom

Production
The writer-director-producer of the film, Samruoddhi Porey is a practicing lawyer in Bombay High Court. The story of the film is based on one of the surrogacy cases she came across.

The film completed its shooting in the rural areas near Melghat-Chikhaldara of Amravati district in Maharashtra.

Aiden Barkely, who plays the role of a 4 year old surrogate child hails from Washington DC. He was selected for the role because of his blonde looks and was then tutored in Marathi, especially the Warhadi dialect. Aiden's father Matt also appears in the film. Matt and his spouse confirmed that Aiden himself was a surrogate child born in India and they were back in India to have their second surrogate child when Porey noticed Aiden and approached them for the role.

Awards and recognition
The film won the National Film Award for Best Feature Film in Marathi. The film was also selected to be shown to President Obama by President Pratibha Patil.

Soundtrack
The music of the film is composed by Ashok Patki on lyrics written by Samruoddhi Porey. Kunal Ganjawala and Vaishali Samant have sung the songs.

References

External links
 
 

2011 films
Indian drama films
Marathi films remade in other languages
Best Marathi Feature Film National Film Award winners
Indian pregnancy films
Films about surrogacy
2010s Marathi-language films